Dominic Bernard Syme (28 October 1921 – 15 April 2013) was an Australian local politician, activist and communist.

He was born in Redfern to James Syme and Annie Sheriff. He grew up in Kogarah and left school at the age of fourteen to work as an apprentice bricklayer. In 1940 he bought a small poultry farm at Moorebank, and became secretary of the Australian Poultry Farmers' Association. He served in Papua New Guinea during World War II, but he contracted malaria and was discharged on medical grounds in 1943. He was briefly a member of the Labor Party but in 1938 joined the Communist Party of Australia (CPA). He married fellow communist Kathleen Stringer in 1952; they were both prominent communists in the 1950s, and in the 1960s and 1970s Syme became an active opponent of the Vietnam War as an unjust invasion. He was also a feminist and conservationist who supported Aboriginal land rights, and in common with the CPA he opposed the Soviet Union's invasion of Czechoslovakia in 1968. In the 1970s he focused on conservation, and campaigned against sandmining on the Georges River. He was assaulted in his home in 1976, which he attributed to his local activism. In 1980 he was elected to Liverpool City Council, where he served for fifteen years. On council he played a key role in establishing the Chipping Norton Lake recreation area. Syme died in 2013.

References

1921 births
2013 deaths
Communist Party of Australia members